The 2023 O Gran Camiño (English: The Great Way) is a road cycling stage race that takes place from 23 to 26 February 2023 in the autonomous community of Galicia in northwestern Spain. The race was rated as a category 2.1 event on the 2023 UCI Europe Tour calendar and was the second edition of the O Gran Camiño.

Teams 
UCI WorldTeams

 
 
 
 

UCI ProTeams

 
 
 
 
 
 
 

UCI Continental Teams

 
 Team Corratec
 Efapel Cycling

Route

Stages

Stage 1 
23 February 2023 — Muralla de Lugo to Sarria, 

The stage was cancelled due to bad weather.

Stage 2 
24 February 2023 — Tui to A Guarda (Monte Trega),

Stage 3 
26 February 2022 — Esgos to Rubiá (Alto do Castelo),

Stage 4 
27 February 2022 — Novo Milladoiro to Santiago,  (ITT)

Classification leadership table

Classification standings

General classification

Points classification

Mountains classification

Young rider classification

Team classification

References

External links 
 

O Gran Camiño
O Gran Camiño
O Gran Camiño